Tripudia paraplesia is a moth in the family Noctuidae first described by Michael G. Pogue in 2009. It is found in north-eastern Mexico. A single specimen was collected in the US state of Louisiana in 1994.

References

Pogue, Michael G. (2009). "A review of the Tripudia quadrifera (Zeller) (Lepidoptera: Noctuidae) species complex". Proceedings of the Entomological Society of Washington. 111 (1): 68-97.

Moths described in 2009
Acontiinae